The Gano Grain Elevator and Scale House near Kinsley, Kansas were built in c.1915.  The property was listed on the National Register of Historic Places in 1993.  It has also been known as the Ardell West Grain Elevator and Scale House.

It is on the southwest corner of US Highway 50 and County Road 9.

The grain elevator is of balloon frame construction and has a capacity of 15,000 bushels.

References

Agricultural buildings and structures on the National Register of Historic Places in Kansas
Buildings and structures completed in 1915
Edwards County, Kansas
Grain elevators in the United States